S. Sivaprakasam is an Indian politician and former Member of the Legislative Assembly of Tamil Nadu. He was elected to the Tamil Nadu legislative assembly as an Anna Dravida Munnetra Kazhagam candidate from Sendamangalam constituency in 1980 and 1984 elections.

References 

All India Anna Dravida Munnetra Kazhagam politicians
Possibly living people
Year of birth missing (living people)
Tamil Nadu MLAs 1985–1989